Sagittaria rigida, the sessilefruit arrowhead or Canadian arrowhead, is an aquatic plant species native to Canada and to the United States and also naturalized in Great Britain. It grows in shallow waters along the edges of ponds and streams. What is really interesting is that it has narrow oval leaves rather than the iconic arrowhead shaped leaves of species like the Sagittaria latifolia. it has sessile female flowers, which is where it gets its name from. Its flowers are very similar to other plants in the Sagittaria family, with three white petals. It grows "potato" like tubers which can be eaten. Gathering any tubers from the Sagittaria family can be dangerous if gathered from polluted water.

References

rigida
Freshwater plants
Flora of the United States
Flora of Canada
Root vegetables
Plants described in 1813
Taxa named by Frederick Traugott Pursh